Sugar Creek is a stream in Cass County in the U.S. state of Missouri. It is a tributary of the South Grand River.

The stream headwaters arise at  approximately six miles southeast of Harrisonville and 1.5 miles east of the community of Daugherty. The stream crosses under Missouri Route 7 two miles southeast of Daugherty and  flows generally south for approximately ten miles to its confluence with the South Grand River at the southern border of Cass County.

Sugar Creek was named for the sugar maple trees lining its course.

See also
List of rivers of Missouri

References

Rivers of Cass County, Missouri
Rivers of Missouri